Acme Film is a film distributor, which operates in Baltic states. The company belongs to ACME Group. Acme Film is official representative for Warner Bros. Pictures, Sony Pictures and DreamWorks Studios; in addition, ACME Film is the partner for Lionsgate, STX, Global Road, Gaumont, Pathé, Hanway Films etc.

Acme Film was established in 1999 in Lithuania. In 2004, the company started operating in Latvia and in 2008 in Estonia.

References

External links
 

Baltic states
Cinema of Estonia
Cinema of Latvia
Cinema of Lithuania
Film distributors
1999 establishments in Lithuania